Pangala is a village in Sri Lanka. It is located within North Central Province.

See also
List of towns in North Central Province, Sri Lanka

External links

Populated places in North Central Province, Sri Lanka
Geography of Anuradhapura District